The 2016 United States Senate election in North Dakota was held November 8, 2016, to elect a member of the United States Senate to represent the State of North Dakota, concurrently with the 2016 U.S. presidential election, as well as other elections to the United States Senate in other states and elections to the United States House of Representatives and various state and local elections. The primaries were held June 14.

Incumbent Republican Senator John Hoeven won re-election to a second term with 78.5% of the vote, the largest margin in the state's history. Hoeven became the first Republican Senator to be re-elected from North Dakota since 1974.

Republican primary

Candidates 
 John Hoeven, incumbent U.S. Senator

Results

Democratic-NPL primary

Candidates 
 Eliot Glassheim, state representative

Results

Libertarian Party

Candidates 
 Robert Marquette

General election

Debates

Predictions

Polling

Results

References

External links 
Official campaign websites
 John Hoeven (R) for Senate
 Eliot Glassheim (D) for Senate
 Robert Marquette (L) for Senate

2016
North Dakota (U.S. state)
United States Senate